It's That Man Again (commonly contracted to ITMA) was a BBC radio comedy programme which ran for twelve series from 1939 to 1949. The shows featured Tommy Handley in the central role, a fast-talking figure, around whom the other characters orbited. The programmes were written by Ted Kavanagh and produced by Francis Worsley. Handley died during the twelfth series, the remaining programmes of which were immediately cancelled: ITMA could not work without him, and no further series were commissioned.

ITMA was a character-driven comedy whose satirical targets included officialdom and the proliferation of minor wartime regulations. Parts of the scripts were rewritten in the hour before the broadcast, to ensure topicality. ITMA broke away from the conventions of previous radio comedies, and from the humour of the music halls. The shows used sound effects in a novel manner, which, alongside a wide range of voices and accents, created the programme's atmosphere.

The show presented more than seventy regular characters during its twelve seasons, most of them with his or her own catchphrase. Among them were the bibulous Colonel Chinstrap ("I don't mind if I do"), the charlady Mrs Mopp ("Can I do you now, sir?"), the incompetent German agent Funf ("this is Funf speaking"), the courtly odd-job men Cecil and Claude ("After you, Claude—no, after you, Cecil"), the Middle Eastern hawker Ali Oop ("I go—I come back"), and the lugubrious Mona Lott ("It's being so cheerful that keeps me going"). To keep the show fresh, old characters were dropped and new ones introduced over the years.

ITMA was an important contributor to British morale during the Second World War, with its cheerful take on the day-to-day preoccupations of the public, but its detailed topicality—one of its greatest attractions at the time—has prevented it from wearing well on repeated hearing. The show's lasting legacy is its influence on subsequent BBC comedy. ITMAs innovative structure—a fast-moving half-hour show with musical interludes and a cast of regular characters with popular catchphrases—was successfully continued in comedy shows of the 1950s and 1960s, such as Take It from Here, The Goon Show and Round the Horne.

Background
The comedian Tommy Handley started as a music hall comedian before becoming a regular feature on BBC radio from 1924. By the end of the 1920s he was, according to the writers Andy Foster and Steve Furst, a household name in Britain; his popularity continued into the 1930s. The scriptwriter Ted Kavanagh was a fan of Handley and wrote a script for a comedy sketch for him in 1926. Handley liked the work and bought it; it was the start of a professional relationship that lasted until Handley's death in 1949.

Although the BBC featured many comic acts in its variety programmes, it had no regular comedy series until early 1938, when Band Waggon and Danger! Men at Work began. The former, which ran for three series in 1938 and 1939, was a particular success; John Watt, the BBC's director of variety, wanted a successor and decided that Handley would be the right person to present it. In June 1939 Handley, Kavanagh and the producer Francis Worsley met at the Langham Hotel, London, to discuss ideas for a sketch show to meet Watt's criteria. They decided to emulate the quick-fire style of American radio programmes such as the Burns and Allen Show, although with a much more English quality.

Initial plans were to call the new programme MUG—the "Ministry of Universal Gratification"—but Worsley preferred ITMA. "ITMA", or "It's That Man Again", referred to Adolf Hitler, and the term was used as a headline to describe him by Bert Gunn, the editor of the Daily Express.

Format
ITMA was a character-driven comedy and contained parody and satire, unlike previous British radio comedy. The programme's satirical targets during the war were government departments and the ostensibly petty wartime regulations, although the programme "never challenged authority but instead acted as a safety valve for the public's irritation with bureaucracy, wartime shortages, queues and the black market", according to the cultural historian Martin Dibbs.

According to Foster and Furst ITMA was "entirely new, breaking away from the conventions of both radio and music hall comedy". It relied on Handley's quick-fire delivery of the humour, with his "near-miraculous technique". The writer and producer John Fisher, in his examination of 20th-century comedians and comedy, highlights ITMAs "speed of delivery, its quick-fire succession of short scenes and verbal non-sequiturs, all breaking away from the traditional music hall sketch orientation of Band Waggon". The broadcasts had an average of eighteen-and-a-half minutes of dialogue into which Kavanagh would attempt to write one hundred laughs—an average of a laugh every eleven seconds. Between the comic scenes there were usually two musical interludes in each show: the first purely orchestral and the second featuring a song from the current resident singer.

The storylines for each week were thin, and the programme was written to have Handley at the centre interacting with a cast of recurring characters, all of whom had their own catchphrase or phrases. The catchphrases were used deliberately to help the listening public to identify which of the characters was speaking. The programme was broadcast live each week and many of the show's sound effects were done live alongside the actors. For ITMA a sound effect was not a shorthand way of setting a scene for a listener, but "as a means of punctuating the rapid progress of events ... doing the work of words, and permitting an extraordinarily economical drama for a medium that relies on words—and sounds", according to the academic Peter Davison. The variety of characters and sounds was key to Kavanagh, who wrote that he wanted:
to use sound for all it was worth, the sound of different voices and accents, the use of catchphrases, the impact of funny sounds in words, of grotesque effects to give atmosphere—every device to create the illusion of rather crazy or inverted reality.

The scripts were written during the week of broadcast to ensure topicality. The year after ITMA ended, Kavanagh reflected "I myself cannot understand some of the jokes. They were skits on a nine-days wonder—a headline of that day's paper, and dead the following week. Every programme is an accurate reflection of the war situation at the time." Some parts of a script were rewritten in the hours leading up to a broadcast as the news changed. Kavanagh visited army camps and factories to listen to the patois and slang, the current jokes doing the rounds, as well as complaints and frustration, and used the material in the show. In this manner, Worsley considers that ITMA was "the closest radio had come to the everyday jokes that ordinary people have always made".

As the programme matured, Kavanagh changed the flow of the programme away from the disjointed collection of scenes or sketches and towards a more defined storyline.

Broadcasts

Pre-war

Series 1: July to August 1939
The first series of ITMA was planned to be a trial run of six shows of 45-minute duration, broadcast fortnightly. They began on 12 July 1939, performed at a BBC sound facility, either at Maida Vale Studios, or St. George's Hall. The shows were broadcast live on the BBC National Programme at 8.15 pm. The programme was set on a ship able to broadcast radio programmes, with Handley as the station controller and presenter. He was accompanied by Cecilia Eddy, Eric Egan and Sam Heppner. The show included a quiz hosted by Lionel Gamlin.

In an article in the Radio Times that accompanied the first programme, Worsley described the premise of the show: Handley "gets hold of a ship, equips it with a transmitter and studio, and sails the Seven Seas scattering broadcast culture (Handley brand) and 'commercials' (any brand)". Music was provided by the Jack Harris Band, who had been performing at London hotspots, including the Café de Paris and the London Casino. With a tense international situation in mid-1939, Kavanagh was careful to avoid writing in political jokes, or any material too topical or sensitive. Handley was known to keep to a script, with little or no ad-libbing to worry the producers.

The fourth episode of ITMA was broadcast on 30 August. When the Second World War broke out on 3 September, the remainder of the series was cancelled. The show had been of limited success, and Worsley thought it was likely to have been "another broadcasting flop".

Wartime

Series 2: September 1939 to February 1940
The BBC had planned for the outbreak of war, and once it was declared, the Variety Department was moved to Bristol. The relocation meant some of the original performers were not available; a new cast was assembled from those who had moved to Bristol and who had received the requisite security clearance from the Ministry of Information. Handley was accompanied by Vera Lennox, Maurice Denham, Sam Costa and Jack Train, and the music for the second series was by the Jack Hylton Band, conducted by Billy Ternent and supported by the Rhythm Octet.

With the idea of a broadcasting ship now too improbable during wartime, the premise of the programme changed to have Handley as the head of the fictional Ministry of Aggravation and Mysteries, where he worked in the Office of Twerps. Other changes to the format included dropping the quiz section of the programme—which Worsley thought held up the flow of the show—replaced by "Radio Fakenburg", a spoof of Radio Luxembourg. The running time was reduced from the 45 minutes of the first series to half an hour, and remained so through all the subsequent series. A blackout was in place for evenings and nights, and all cinemas and theatres had been closed by the government; such measures provided a boost to the listening figures for the show. The writer and comedian Barry Took writes that the success also came from the programme's "self-assurance and cheerful optimism [which was] a welcome relief in that time of fear and uncertainty".

The second series of ITMA finished in February 1940 and the show went on a nationwide tour that kept it off the air for nearly 18 months, except for one special edition in May 1940. Took notes that the show lacked the impact it had on radio, as Handley's performances were more intimate through a microphone than in a theatre.

Series 3 and 4: June 1941 to May 1942
While ITMA was absent from the airwaves, the German bombing campaign had included Bristol, which triggered a move of the Variety Department to Bangor, northwest Wales, in April 1941. When series three began broadcasting in June 1941, Kavanagh had introduced more characters, and set the show in the fictional seaside town of Foaming-at-the-Mouth with Handley as its mayor, renaming the programme, briefly, It's That Sand Again, before it reverted to ITMA. There were also changes in the cast. Denham and Costa had both joined the armed forces since the previous series; new actors were brought in, including Horace Percival, Dorothy Summers, Clarence Wright and Fred Yule.

Series 3 ran for six weeks, ending on 25 July 1941. Series 4 followed two months later, beginning on 26 September. The programme was attracting 16 million listeners by this stage, and was the most popular programme the BBC Variety Department had ever broadcast. During programme five, listeners heard the explosion of two naval mines that had been dropped on Bangor, landing half a mile (0.8 km) from the studio, instead of in the River Mersey. Although the actors continued after a brief pause, the programme had been taken off the air and replaced with music.

In April 1942 ITMA provided a command performance at Windsor Castle in the presence of George VI and his queen on the occasion of the 16th birthday of Princess Elizabeth. It was, notes Worsley, the first Royal Command Radio Show. The royal family were fans of the programme; a member of the Royal Household said that if the war were to end between 8.30 and 9.00 pm on a Thursday night none of the household would dare to tell the King until ITMA had finished.

Series 5 and 6: September 1942 to July 1943
Series 5 started in September 1942 and ran for twenty weeks. One of the programmes in November was broadcast on the BBC Forces Programme to the soldiers in North Africa, the first time the show had been transmitted to the troops. The shows became increasingly topical and up-to-the-minute. Worsley began experimenting with the size of the audience to see which worked best. He tried in the theatres and cinemas of Bangor and Llandudno to get an audience of 2000, and in the studio in Bangor with 200; he also tried with no audience, and settled on 200 as the right number. The premise of the show changed again with Handley ejected as the mayor of Foaming-in-the-Mouth, and now the manager of a munitions factory. Several new characters were introduced, including Colonel Chinstrap, a dipsomaniac retired army officer voiced by Train.

Before the sixth series began recording, a film version, It's That Man Again, was released. Starring Handley and including many of the radio programme regulars, it was written by Kavanagh and Howard Irving Young and directed by Walter Forde. The Times considered it difficult to transpose a radio show format onto a cinema screen, but thought Forde "manages his difficult task extremely well". As a consequence, the reviewer thought the film "achieves at least a partial success through the extravagance of its own craziness".

The scenario of the programme changed again for series six, when, following a decision to move the munitions factory underground, a sulphur spring was tapped and Foaming-in-the-Mouth became a spa.

Series 7 and 8: October 1943 to June 1945

In the latter part of 1943 the Variety Department finished a relocation back to London. Series 7 of ITMA, which began in October that year, was recorded in the Criterion Theatre at Piccadilly Circus. The show restarted without Train, whose health, which had been worsening for some time, broke down completely; he spent a year in a sanatorium in North Wales recovering. Worsley took the decision to rest Train's characters rather than have another actor portray him; although he was criticised for the decision, he said "any imitation was to my mind as paste to real diamonds". The series included broadcasts for each of the three forces: in January 1944 ITMA was broadcast from the Royal Navy base at Scapa Flow, a show for the Royal Air Force was recorded at the Criterion in February, and an Army edition from the Garrison Theatre at the Royal Artillery Barracks, Woolwich.

Series 8 began in September 1944 with a special show from the Wolseley Motors factory in Birmingham, but the show was not well received, and it was decided not to have any further broadcasts away from the studio. Train returned to the cast, but at the end of 1944 Worsley was hospitalised for seven months. The production duties were taken up by Ronnie Waldman until Worsley returned in May 1945. His first programme back was V-ITMA, the special edition show of 11 May 1945, which celebrated the end of the war in Europe. The series came to an end a month later, after a run of 39 weeks.

Post-war

Series 9 to 12, post-war: September 1945 to January 1949

For the start of the post-war ITMAs, Handley, Kavanagh and Worsley decided to change many of the cast to keep the show fresh; Dorothy Summers, Sydney Keith, Dino Galvani and Horace Percival were all released from the show and replaced by Hugh Morton, Mary O'Farrell, Carleton Hobbs and Lind Joyce; Clarence Wright returned to the programme. The premise of the show changed too: Handley left Foaming-in-the-Mouth and became the governor of the fictional island of Tomtopia. The storyline towards the end of series 9 centred on a government investigation of the administration on Tomtopia; the series ended in June 1946 with Handley leaving Tomtopia to return to Britain.

A prequel programme to series 10, "Whither Tomtopia?", was based in the idea that Handley had "to face an enquiry into his governorship" of the island. He faced questions from, among others, Dilys Powell—the film critic from The Sunday Times—the medical spokesman Dr Charles Hill and the author A. G. Street; the programme was chaired by Sir William Darling, MP. The remainder of the series dealt with Handley living in the fictional Castle WeeHoose in Scotland, where he was building a rocket to take him to the Moon. In about week six of the series, the rocket was launched, but crash-landed on Tomtopia, where a new governor—Percy Palaver, played by Deryck Guyler—was in charge.

Series 11, which began in September 1947, had the final recruit to the ITMA cast: Hattie Jacques, who played Ella Phant and Sophie Tuckshop. She became so nervous during the audition that Handley held her hand, which she found made her more nervous. Handley's health was beginning to decline by the end of the 38-week series, and it was suggested that series 12 should be delayed. He said no, and ITMA began again in September 1948. On 9 January 1949, three days after the sixteenth episode of the series—the 310th episode of ITMA—Handley died suddenly of a cerebral haemorrhage. The news was announced on that evening's radio, at the close of the Sunday evening repeat of the show, by the Director General of the BBC, Sir William Haley, who insisted on making the announcement himself. Without its star, ITMA was cancelled; Took observes that Handley "was so much the keystone and embodiment of the actual performance that ITMA died with him".

Leading characters
The main character was always Handley's, whether as manager of the pirate radio station, head of the Office of Twerps, Mayor of Foaming-at-the-Mouth, factory manager, Governor of Tomtopia or down-and-out. He remained the fast-talking central figure, around whom all the other characters orbited. Took comments that it is impossible to put them into order of popularity: "They were all successful. Everyone had their own favourite". Some of the best known are described below, in order of first appearance in the show.

Funf

Funf, "the enemy agent with the feet of sauerkraut", was the earliest of the show's major supporting characters, making his debut in the second programme of the second series. He was an incompetent German agent, ITMAs response to a national scare in 1940 about a supposed "fifth column" in Britain. He would telephone Handley to make dark threats, in a sinister, hollow voice, which Train produced by speaking across the top of an empty glass held next to the microphone. Handley's verbal dexterity continually left Funf in confusion. Funf, described by the media historian Denis Gifford as "the greatest of all war-time characters", became what Worsley called "a national craze" and helped to make the German propaganda machine a source of public ridicule in Britain.

The Diver

The Diver was drawn from a real-life figure familiar to Handley's generation of Merseysiders. The one-legged diver and swimmer Frank Gadsby was well known at New Brighton in the first decades of the 20th century for high-diving off the pier, watched by what the Liverpool Echo called "countless boatloads of people" He would solicit donations with phrases appropriated by his caricature in ITMA: "Don't forget the diver, sir, don't forget the diver. Every penny makes the water warmer!"

In ITMA the Diver was what Worsley called a "crossing" character: he would cross a scene for a few seconds, often to interrupt Handley at a particularly inopportune moment:

Cecil and Claude

Two ceremonious odd-job men—also broker's men—who talked in rhyme:Cecil: After you, Claude –Claude: No, after you, CecilHandley: Cut out the etiquette—you've a big job to do.Cecil: Do you want us to push your chair, Mr Mayor?Claude: It'll need a new tyre, sire.Handley: No. I want you to go round to the lighthouse and lend a hand erecting our Foaming Fun Fair.Cecil: Will there be swings and things?Claude: There'll be coconut shies I surmise.Handley: Yes, and merry-go-rounds, you hounds ...Cecil: Then we'll have a dekko Sir Echo.Claude: We'll have a penn'orth Sir Kenneth.

Ali Oop

Ali Oop was a caricature of a Middle-Eastern hawker, persistently trying to sell improbable goods to Handley:Ali Oop: Please mister, you give me permission to peddle on your pier?Handley: Certainly not.Ali Oop: Any other town I peddle where I like.Handley: Ah, but we're very particular here.Ali Oop: You give me licence—I give you very funny toy. Make loud noises when sat on.Handley: They used to laugh when I sat down at the piano. You get out of here and take your penetrating effluvia with you.Ali Oop: I go—I come back.

Sam Scram and Lefty

Sam and Lefty were two American characters, both nominally gangsters, but of a conspicuously uncombative kind. Sam, Handley's bodyguard, was prone to panic:Sam: Boss, boss, sumpin' terrible's happened!Handley: Don't tell me the Scharnhorst has come up again?Sam: No, there's a tough-looking guy outside, boss.Handley: Has he got a broken handcuff on one wrist?Sam: Yes, boss!Handley: And a bludgeon in the other?Sam: Yeah, boss!Handley: And crime written all over his face?Sam: Yeah, boss!Handley: It's my brother: send him in.
Lefty was of a nervous disposition. At a fairground shooting gallery with Sam:Lefty: I got the gun—they're going to get the woiks. ... Missed 'em!Sam: I thought you were a dead shot with one of dem tings.Lefty: Aw—it's me noives, I tell ya—its me noives.

When Train was ill during series 7, Lefty was temporarily replaced by Butch Scram, Sam's brother, played by Bryan Herbert.

Mrs Mopp

Although Mrs Mopp, the charlady, was in fewer than half the series of ITMA, she was one of the best-loved characters, and was remembered long after the show finished. She would burst through Handley's door, usually when least convenient, and hoarsely ask, "Can I do you now sir?" She regularly brought Handley peculiar presents, nominally edible as a rule, beginning with some carrot jelly she had sieved through her jumper. In a show recorded before a Royal Navy audience she brought him "a Bosun's Blancmange". At the end of their scenes together she would bid him "Ta-ta for now", soon abbreviated to "TTFN".Mrs Mopp: Can I do you now, sir?Handley: Well, if it isn't Mrs Mopp the vamping vassal with the tousled tassel. I thought you told me you were called up?Mrs Mopp: Well, sir, I had me medical.Handley: And were you passed A.1?Mrs Mopp: Oh no, sir. I'm passed sixty-two.Handley: You don't look a day over sixty-one. I mean, were you passed fit? ...Mrs Mopp: No, sir—I was examined by a lady doctor. She wanted me to remove my bonnet.Handley: Disgraceful! I expect she wanted to open a false front.Mrs Mopp: I wouldn't let her meddle with my modesty vest, sir. I said, "You must take me as you find me". The Labour [viz. labour exchange] sent me to you, sir.Handley: The Labour? That's capital. I'll put you in charge of the sock exchange.Mrs Mopp: Oh, thank you, sir. I brought this for you.Handley: Isn't that nice. What is it—an engineer's indiscretion?Mrs Mopp: No, sir, it's an overseer's 'otpot.Handley: Thank you, Mrs M. There'll be an 'otpot in the Old Tom tonight.Mrs Mopp: Ta-ta for now.

At their last meeting Mrs Mopp bade Handley "TTFN", to which he responded, "NCTWWASBE"—"Never Clean The Window With A Soft-Boiled Egg". After being written out of ITMA she had her own series of quarter-hour programmes, The Private Life of Mrs Mopp, written by Kavanagh.

Commercial Traveller

The Commercial Traveller, like the Diver, was a "crossing" character, distracting Handley from the business at hand with his irrelevant sales patter:Traveller: Good morning.Handley: Good morningTraveller: Nice day.Handley: No.Traveller: Any helicopters, motor cars or washing machines?Handley: Yes, please.Traveller: You can't have them—they're only for export.Handley: What have you come here for, then?Traveller: So that I can call again. Good morning.Handley: Good morning.Traveller: Nice day.

Signor So-So

Handley's scatty secretary was planned as an Italian equivalent of Funf, but "his chronic mismanagement of the English tongue proved too endearing and he remained at Handley's side as a well-loved language joke". His incurable tendency to malapropisms caused him to address a female character: "Ah, you attract me like a maggot! Let me cuss you on both cheeks". His verbal infelicities became infectious and regularly caused Handley's character to trip over his words:Handley: Now, So-So, you are an architect, aren't you?So-So: Oh yes, Mr Hagglemuch. I am an unqualified artichoke. I have built many sky-scrappers, and bolks of falts.Handley: Bolks of falts?So-So: Yes—luxury falts.Handley: Now listen, you leaning tower of Pisa, you can say bolks of falts as easy as I can.So-So: You mean blocks of flats. I have also built a villain in the country.Handley: A villain?So-So: Yes, a semi-detached villain. ... Come this way. This is your office. I will finish it.Handley: Listen, So-So, leave the finishing—er—furnishing of this to me. Any more of your basic English and I'd go mad.So-So: Oka-da-doke.

Colonel Chinstrap

The bibulous Colonel Chinstrap was a retired army officer, perpetually on the look-out for a free drink. The Times commented that his voice "carried the unmistakeable aroma of vintage port and brandy". An unnamed prototype of the character appeared in the third series:Handley: Didn't I meet you in Rumbellipoor, sir?Train: You did not, sir. I was never there.Handley: Then you must have a double.Train: Thanks, I will.

The character reappeared in the fifth series, now identified as Colonel Humphrey Chinstrap; he rapidly became one of the show's most popular features. He would "mishear" an innocent remark as an invitation to a drink:

The catchphrase, "I don't mind if I do", was not new, but ITMA brought it into widespread popular use.
The Colonel had a life beyond ITMA. Train ("assisted by Colonel Chinstrap") made a gramophone record of a song called "I don't mind if I do" in 1949; Chinstrap and his ITMA colleague Major Mundy offered comments on the Lord's Test Match in two short broadcasts in June 1949; Train, playing Chinstrap, co-starred in the 1950 comedy series The Great Gilhooly, and appeared weekly on television in late 1951 and early 1952 with scenes from the Colonel's life story. In 1952 Evans Brothers published Chinstrap's autobiography—ghost-written by Kavanagh, with a foreword by Train. In a 1954 BBC radio programme he featured in The True Story of Humphrey Chinstrap (Col. Retd.), "the authentic history of a warrior who penetrated the darkest jungles of Whitehall and Wooloomooloo armed only with a sword and a corkscrew". Train twice made guest appearances as Chinstrap in The Goon Show (1957 and 1959).

Mona Lott

Mona Lott (subsequently, after her marriage, Mona Little), the lugubrious laundress, was among the later creations to feature in the show, appearing in the last three series. She would regale Handley with her latest woes, her doleful demeanour in ludicrous contrast with her mantra, "It's being so cheerful that keeps me going". For Mona, a domestic disaster such as a burst water tank would become increasingly calamitous, until her husband ...

Among other catastrophes recounted by Mona were her brother-in-law, a champion runner, walking in his sleep and getting half-way to Brighton before anyone could catch him, and, when on a train journey, "I put me head out of the window to look at the view, and the mail-bag catcher caught me. Before I knew where I was I found myself on the platform between a sack of fertiliser and a dead duck".

Sophie Tuckshop

Sophie Tuckshop was a replacement for a less successful character, Ella Phant. Jokes about the latter's size did not work well on radio because the light and girlish voice of the performer, Hattie Jacques, did not suggest a heavyweight. She described Sophie as "a terrible child who never stopped eating, with the inevitable sickening results".Sophie: I had such a lovely dream last night—I dreamt the bed was made of marzipan and the mattress was marshmallow and the sheets were jelly and the pillows embroidered with lovely sugar violets.Handley''': Stop! Once more we halt the roar of Sophie's Tuckshop to tell you of some of the interesting things that are In Tum Tonight! Carry on, Bicarb!

Other characters
Kavanagh and the ITMA team caricatured people of all ages, both sexes, and many nationalities, classes and professions. There were spoofs of national and regional types, including Johann Bull, a conspicuously Teutonic German agent trying to pass himself off as English; Chief Bigga Banga of Tomtopia, who spoke no English and Wamba M'Boojah who spoke with the grandest of Oxford accents, having been a BBC announcer; the American publicity agent, Luke Slippy; Hari Kari, a Japanese caller whose gibberish only Handley could understand, and his compatriots Bowing and Scraping. From the British regions there were the Scottish Tattie Mackintosh (and her mother); the Welsh Sam Fairfechan ("Hello, how are you? As if I cared") and his family; and the Liverpudlian Frisby Dyke, with a strong Scouse accent, puzzled by some of Handley's longer words ("What's a concentrated cacophony?"), but usually winning their weekly battle of wits.

Leading female characters included three secretaries to Handley in his various capacities: Cilly, Dotty (her sister), and the formidable but soft-hearted Miss Hotchkiss; Mrs Lola Tickle, Handley's first charlady; the shy Lady Sonely; Banjeleo, Bigga Banga's daughter and translator; Nurse Riff-Rafferty, Handley's old nanny, with a fund of embarrassing stories of his early years; Naieve, Major Mundy's old-fashioned daughter; the "pert poppet" Poppy Poopah; Ruby Rockcake who ran the railway buffet: "No cups outside!"; the generously proportioned Ella Phant; and the two unnamed Posh Ladies, whose conversations were strewn with "dahlings" and always ended with the cry, "Taxi!"

Military figures in addition to Colonel Chinstrap included his puritanical nephew Brigadier Dear, mortified by his uncle's excesses; and Major Mundy, a British expatriate on Tomtopia with an unreconstructed 19th-century mindset.

Among the mock authority figures were Sir Short Supply, a strangulated-voiced bureaucrat; the Town Clerk, a north-country official who would offer "have a cher, Mr Mer", later Mer himself; Fusspot, an official whose name was self-explanatory; two characters with a habit of repeating the ends of their sentences: the Man from the Ministry and Inspector Squirt: "I'm Inspector Squirt—I said Squirt"; and Percy Palaver, appointed governor of Tomtopia in Handley's absence, and notable for his generally unintelligible speech punctuated with "oomyahs" and "harrumphs".

Professions and occupations were represented by, among others, the announcer at Radio Fakenburg; Atlas, the hypochondriac strongman; Bookham, a variety agent; Curly Kale, a chef who hated food and loved dreadful old jokes; Dan Dungeon, the jocose tour guide at Castle Weehouse; Farmer Jollop; Lemuel the office boy; Norman the Doorman; and Vodkin and Vladivostooge, two mad scientists.

Eccentrics included Basil Backwards ("Sir, morning good! Coffee of cup. Strong too not. Milk have rather I'd"); George Gorge, a champion glutton; Comical Chris, a persistent would-be joker; Mark Time, a nonagenarian whose response to anything was, "I'll have to ask me dad"; Mr Sninch-of-Puff, a man who spoke in spoonerisms; and Whats'isname, a man who struggled to recall the simplest nouns, and had the same effect on Handley.

Performers
The list is not exhaustive: members of the cast played many other roles, mostly one-off, unnamed, and sometimes not even human; the singers, the orchestra and the musical director, Charles Shadwell, sometimes had lines in the script. From time to time guests appeared on the show. There were recurring characters who were mentioned frequently but were never heard, such as Peter Geekie, or appeared regularly but were not given a name, such as Carleton Hobbs's man whose banal weekly tales began and ended "Ain't it a shame, eh? Ain't it a shame?" and Hugh Morton's speaker whose sentences began softly and ended in a deafening shout.

Sources: Foster and Furst (1999); Gifford (1985) and Kavanagh (1975).

Catchphrases
The following are among the best known of the catchphrases from the show. Some became common currency among the general public for many years; others were more ephemeral. One—"TTFN"—remained in frequent use throughout the second half of the 20th century and into the 21st, latterly being used in chat rooms, emails and newsgroups to sign off a message or posting. "It's being so cheerful that keeps me going" also remains in use, seen in British newspapers many times in the first two decades of the 21st century.

ReputationThe Times commented that ITMA "achieved a humour of universal appeal and found eager listeners in every rank of society". A 2002 history of Britain in the first half of the 20th century called the show "the most celebrated wartime radio programme ... praised by intellectuals for its surrealism and wordplay, but loved by the mass listening public for its delirious silliness". The size of the audience was unprecedented; one historian records that more than sixteen million people listened to ITMA every week", and another that "a staggering 40 per cent of the population" regularly tuned in. But the show was not without its critics. Took quotes hostile letters to Radio Times: "Why should the producers in the Variety department assume that the listeners are a body of half-wits? The puns served up last night in "ITMA" were an insult to anyone's intelligence" (1939) and "I am constantly amazed by the number of otherwise intelligent people who rave about this programme. I have tried to discover some sort of level of culture or intelligence from which ITMA fans are drawn—but in vain" (1944). In 1947 a Scottish MP, Jean Mann, referred to Handley—or his character—as a "twerp".

In the show's early days critical response was not uniformly enthusiastic. The radio critic of The Manchester Guardian wrote in December 1939 that amusing as the show could be, "it is beginning to pall by its regularity and its attachment to the same style of humour". By the end of the last series, in 1949, writers in the same paper were comparing ITMA to the comedies of Aristophanes and Ben Jonson, as "a brilliant, penetrating commentary on our times ... enlightening millions of people—a cunningly dispensed and cleverly administered medicine for the lesser ills of society". A contemporary critic observed that ITMA was entirely original and avoided stock characters:

Historians of the show acknowledge that the topicality that was one of ITMA's strengths has prevented it from wearing well. Kavanagh himself admitted that reading his old scripts he could not work out what some of the jokes were about. Even while the show was still running, its producer, Worsley, said that recordings of earlier series "seem curiously dusty and faded, like an album of old photographs".

In a 2013 study of British comedy, John Fisher emphasises the influence of ITMA on later comedy shows by virtue of "its speed of delivery, its quick-fire succession of short scenes and verbal non-sequiturs, its surrealist overtones, all breaking away from the traditional music hall sketch orientation of Band Waggon, and anticipating Take It From Here, and even more so The Goon Show and Round the Horne''".

Notes and references

Notes

References

Sources

Books

Episodes

Gramophone records

Journals

Magazines

Newspapers

Websites

External links

 
 
 

BBC Radio comedy programmes
BBC Light Programme programmes
1939 radio programme debuts
1949 radio programme endings